Grand General (released 1 Feb 2013 in Oslo, Norway by label Rune Grammofon – RCD2139) is a Jazz rock album by the new Norwegian band Grand General, with violinist Ola Kvernberg.

Review 
This album is a heavy and melodic revelation from the new band Grand General consisting of some very prolific musicians from the Norwegian prog, jazz, rock scene. They started out as Kenneth Kapstad Group giving some gigs with this impressive lineup and is out with a more fitting name for their debut album. With the much gifted violinist Ola Kvernberg, who was awarded Jazz Spellemannprisen, the Norwegian Grammy, for his album Liarbird (2011). The lines to the Mahavishnu Orchestra is obvious, when trying to place Grand General in a musical perspective.

Reception 
The review by AllMusic critique Dave Lynch awarded the album 4.5 stars.

Track listing

Musicians 
Ola Kvernberg - violins & viola 
Even Helte Hermansen - guitar
Erlend Slettevoll - keyboards
Trond Frønes - bass
Kenneth Kapstad - drums

Notes 
Music written by Ola Kvernberg (tracks: #4 & #5) and Trond Frønes (tracks: #1-3 & #6)
Mastered by Morten Stendahl at Redroom
Produced by Grand General
Recorded & mixed by Magnus Børmark at Øra Studio
Sleeve by Kim Hiorthøy

References

External links 
Ola Kvernberg Official Website
Liarbird at Kolben Consert Hall September 17, 2011, Rikskonsertene on YouTube

Rock albums by Norwegian artists
Jazz albums by Norwegian artists
2013 albums